We Were the Mulvaneys is a 2002 American television film directed by Peter Werner, written by Joyce Eliason, and starring Beau Bridges, Blythe Danner and Tammy Blanchard. It is based on the book of the same name by Joyce Carol Oates. It premiered on Lifetime Television, and was nominated for three Emmys.

Cast
 Beau Bridges as Michael Mulvaney, Sr.
 Blythe Danner as Corinne Mulvaney
 Tammy Blanchard as Marianne Mulvaney
 Tom Guiry as Judd Mulvaney, the narrator 
 Jacob Pitts as Patrick Mulvaney
 Mark Famiglietti as Mike Mulvaney Jr.
 Shawn Roberts as Zachary Lundt
 Colin Ferguson as Dr. Witt

Production
We Were the Mulvaneys was filmed in Winnipeg, Manitoba, Canada.

External links
 

2002 television films
2002 films
2002 drama films
American drama television films
Lifetime (TV network) films
Films based on American novels
Films directed by Peter Werner
Films scored by Patrick Williams
2000s English-language films
2000s American films